Marcetia may refer to:
 Marcetia (plant), a genus of plants in the family Melastomataceae
 Marcetia (mammal), a fossil genus of mammals in the family Mustelidae